The phonautograph is the earliest known device for recording sound. Previously, tracings had been obtained of the sound-producing vibratory motions of tuning forks and other objects by physical contact with them, but not of actual sound waves as they propagated through air or other media. Invented by Frenchman Édouard-Léon Scott de Martinville, it was patented on March 25, 1857. It transcribed sound waves as undulations or other deviations in a line traced on smoke-blackened paper or glass. Intended solely as a laboratory instrument for the study of acoustics, it could be used to visually study and measure the amplitude envelopes and waveforms of speech and other sounds, or to determine the frequency of a given musical pitch by comparison with a simultaneously recorded reference frequency.

Apparently, it did not occur to anyone before the 1870s that the recordings, called phonautograms, contained enough information about the sound that they could, in theory, be used to recreate it. Because the phonautogram tracing was an insubstantial two-dimensional line, direct physical playback was impossible in any case. However, several phonautograms recorded before 1861 were successfully played as sound in 2008 by optically scanning them and using a computer to process the scans into digital audio files.

Construction 

The phonautograph was invented on March 25, 1857 by Frenchman Édouard-Léon Scott de Martinville, an editor and typographer of manuscripts at a scientific publishing house in Paris. One day while editing Professor Longet's Traité de Physiologie, he happened upon that customer’s engraved illustration of the anatomy of the human ear, and conceived of "the imprudent idea of photographing the word." In 1853 or 1854 (Scott cited both years) he began working on "le problème de la parole s'écrivant elle-même" ("the problem of speech writing itself"), aiming to build a device that could replicate the function of the human ear. 

Scott coated a plate of glass with a thin layer of lampblack. He then took an acoustic trumpet, and at its tapered end affixed a thin membrane that served as the analog to the eardrum. At the center of that membrane, he attached a rigid boar's bristle approximately a centimeter long, placed so that it just grazed the lampblack. As the glass plate was slid horizontally in a well formed groove at a speed of one meter per second, a person would speak into the trumpet, causing the membrane to vibrate and the stylus to trace figures that were scratched into the lampblack. On March 25, 1857, Scott received the French patent #17,897/31,470 for his device, which he called a phonautograph. The earliest known surviving recorded sound of a human voice was conducted on April 9, 1860 when Scott recorded someone singing the song "Au Clair de la Lune" ("By the Light of the Moon") on the device. However, the device was not designed to play back sounds, as Scott intended for people to read back the tracings, which he called phonautograms. This was not the first time someone had used a device to create direct tracings of the vibrations of sound-producing objects, as tuning forks had been used in this way by English physicist Thomas Young in 1807. By late 1857, with support from the Société d'encouragement pour l'industrie nationale, Scott’s phonautograph was recording sounds with sufficient precision to be adopted by the scientific community, paving the way for the nascent science of acoustics. 

The device's true significance in the history of recorded sound was not fully realized prior to March 2008, when it was discovered and resurrected in a Paris patent office by First Sounds, an informal collaborative of American audio historians, recording engineers, and sound archivists founded to make the earliest sound recordings available to the public. The phonautograms were then digitally converted by scientists at the Lawrence Berkeley National Laboratory in California, who were able to play back the recorded sounds, something Scott had never conceived of. Prior to this point, the earliest known record of a human voice was thought to be an 1877 phonograph recording by Thomas Edison. The phonautograph would play a role in the development of the gramophone, whose inventor, Emile Berliner, worked with the phonautograph in the course of developing his own device.

Playback 

By mid-April 1877, Charles Cros had realized that a phonautograph recording could be converted back into sound by photoengraving the tracing into a metal surface to create a playable groove, then using a stylus and diaphragm similar to those of the phonautograph to reverse the recording process and recreate the sound. Before he was able to put his ideas into practice, the announcement of Thomas Edison's phonograph, which recorded sound waves by indenting them into a sheet of tinfoil from which they could be played back immediately, temporarily relegated Cros's less direct method to obscurity.

Ten years later, the early experiments of Emile Berliner, the creator of the disc Gramophone, employed a recording machine that was in essence a disc form of the phonautograph. It traced a clear sound-modulated spiral line through a thin black coating on a glass disc. The photoengraving method first proposed by Cros was then used to produce a metal disc with a playable groove. Arguably, these circa 1887 experiments by Berliner were the first known reproductions of sound from phonautograph recordings.

However, as far as is known, no attempt was ever made to use this method to play any of the surviving early phonautograms made by Scott de Martinville. Possibly this was because the few images of them generally available in books and periodicals were of unpromising short bursts of sound, of fragmentary areas of longer recordings, or simply too crude and indistinct to encourage such an experiment.

Nearly 150 years after they had been recorded, promising specimens of Scott de Martinville's phonautograms, stored among his papers in France's patent office and at the Académie des Sciences, were located by American audio historians. High-quality images of them were obtained. In 2008, the team played back the recordings as sound for the first time. Modern computer-based image processing methods were used to accomplish the playback. The first results were obtained by using a specialized system developed for optically playing recordings on more conventional media which were too fragile or damaged to be played by traditional means. Later, generally available image-editing and image-to-sound conversion software, requiring only a high-quality scan of the phonautogram and an ordinary personal computer, were found to be sufficient for this application.

No matter what hardware and software are used, the basic principle involved is relatively simple. If a greatly enlarged image of a segment of a phonautograph tracing were projected as a horizontally-oriented undulating line on a sheet of graph paper, a numerical description of the line could be created by proceeding from one grid column to the next, counting the number of squares between the line and a straight horizontal reference line, and making a list of the numbers. Such a list is, in fact, a digital audio file of the simplest kind. If entered into a computer in the required format and with the required file header information, it can be played as sound. A computer needs no projector or graph paper to convert a scanned phonautogram into a playable digital audio file by comparable procedures.

One complication is that Scott de Martinville's phonautograms were recorded on machines which were hand-cranked rather than motor-driven, resulting in unsteady rotation of the cylinder. The irregular wavering of pitch caused by
playing back such recordings at a constant speed can make speech much more difficult to understand and has obvious dire effects on the reproduction of music. Fortunately, several phonautograms had a separate parallel track, inscribed simultaneously with the voice track, in which a constant reference tone had been recorded. By working with short segments of the paired tracks and adjusting both so that the reference tone was held to a steady pitch, it was possible to correct the irregularity and greatly improve the results.

Recovered sounds 

 

One phonautogram, created on April 9, 1860, was revealed to be a 20-second recording of the French folk song "Au clair de la lune". It was initially played at double the original recording speed and believed to be the voice of a woman or child. However, further recordings were uncovered accompanied with notes de Martinville made that inadvertently identified himself as the speaker. At the correct speed, the voice of a man, almost certainly de Martinville himself, is heard singing the song very slowly. Also recovered were two 1860 recordings of "Vole, petite abeille" ("Fly, Little Bee"), a lively song from a comic opera. Previously, the earliest known recording of vocal music was an 1888 Edison wax cylinder phonograph recording of a Handel choral concert.

A phonautogram containing the opening lines of Torquato Tasso's pastoral drama Aminta has also been found. Probably recorded in April or May 1860, this phonautogram is the earliest known recording of intelligible spoken words to be played back, predating Frank Lambert's 1878 talking clock recording. Earlier recordings, made in 1857, 1854, and 1853, also contain de Martinville's voice but are unintelligible because of their low quality, brevity and irregularity of speed. Only one of these recordings, 1857 cornet scale recording, was restored and made intelligible.

See also 
 History of sound recording

References

Further reading 
 Koenigsberg, Allen. The Birth of the Recording Industry, adapted from "The Seventeen-Year Itch", delivered at the U.S. Patent Office bi-centennial in Washington, D.C. on May 9, 1990.

External links 

 FirstSounds.org, an informal collaborative aiming to make mankind's earliest sound recordings available to all people for all time.
 The Phonautographic Manuscripts of Édouard-Léon Scott de Martinville (PDF), containing French and English texts of all Scott's known writings about the phonautograph from the 1850s and 1860s.

Acoustics
Sound recording technology
Audiovisual introductions in 1857